Eugene G. (Pat) Patterson (October 8, 1919 – February 15, 2004) was an American politician in the state of Washington. He served in the Washington House of Representatives from 1973 to 19781for district 9, and in the Senate from 1981 to 1993.

References

1919 births
2004 deaths
Republican Party members of the Washington House of Representatives
20th-century American politicians
Republican Party Washington (state) state senators